Christopher Henry Briault Byworth (1939–2017) was an English Anglican priest, liturgist, and biblical scholar. Having held parish appointments in the dioceses of Chelmsford, Manchester, London and Norwich, he was Warden of Cranmer Hall, Durham, from 1979 to 1983. He then returned to parish ministry, serving for the rest of his career in the Diocese of Liverpool. As a liturgist, he co-authored the first, though illegal, modern English eucharistic liturgy for the Church of England in 1968, and was then involved in writing or contributing to a number of new services such as one for celebrating the birth of a child without baptism. An evangelical Anglican, he taught the New Testament at Oak Hill Theological College before joining the leadership of Cranmer Hall, an evangelical Anglican theological college. He died on 31 August 2017.

Works

References

1939 births
2017 deaths
20th-century Anglican theologians
20th-century English Anglican priests
21st-century Anglican theologians
21st-century English Anglican priests
Anglican liturgists
Evangelical Anglican biblical scholars
Evangelical Anglican theologians
English Anglican theologians
New Testament scholars
Staff of Cranmer Hall, Durham